Mürzhofen was a municipality in Austria which merged in January 2015 into Kindberg in the Bruck-Mürzzuschlag District of Styria, Austria.

References

Cities and towns in Bruck-Mürzzuschlag District